James Frederic Danielli FRS (1911–1984) was an English biologist.

He was famous for research on the structure and the permeability of cell membranes, developing a physical-chemical model in collaboration with the physiologist Hugh Davson. This became known as the Davson-Danielli or "protein sandwich" model. He also carried out studies on the chemistry of enzymes and proteins and tried to construct an artificial "cell".

References

English physiologists
Fellows of the Royal Society
1911 births
1984 deaths